Oliver Jens Schmitt (born 15 February 1973 in Basel) is a professor of South-East European history at Vienna University since 2005. He is a member of the Austrian Academy of Sciences.

His book Skanderbeg. Der neue Alexander auf dem Balkan, a critical biography of George Castrioti-Skanderbeg, caused a hot debate in Albania. A Swiss national daily newspaper Tages-Anzeiger published Schmitt's interview given to Enver Robelli in Tirana on 25 February 2009, in which it is emphasized that Schmitt claims that Skanderbeg's mother Voisava was Serbian, a member of the Branković family and that the Kastrioti surname probably is derived from Greek word kastron (fort). He was accused of committing sacrilege and sullying the Albanian national honor. Ardian Klosi, who translated his book from German to Albanian, was accused of treason.

Schmitt, in response to critics, said that he had never claimed Skanderbeg was Serbian and furthermore states that he considers him to have been an Albanian.

Selected works 
 
 "Skanderbegs letzte Jahre. West-östliches Wechselspiel von Diplomatie und Krieg im Zeitalter der osmanischen Eroberung Albaniens (1464–1468)", Südost-Forschung 62 (2004/2005): 56–123.
 Levantiner. Lebenswelten und Identitäten einer ethnokonfessionellen Gemeinschaft im osmanischen Reich im "langen 19. Jahrhundert", Munich: R. Oldenbourg Verlag, 2005.
 "Die Ägäis als Kommunikationsraum im späten Mittelalter", Saeculum 56 (2005): 215–225. 
 "Les Levantins, les Européens et le jeu d'identités", Smyrne, la ville oubliée? : Mémoires d'un grand port ottoman, 1830–1930, ed. Marie-Carmen Smyrnelis, Paris: Autrement, 2006. 106–119.
 "Venezianische Horizonte der Geschichte Südosteuropas", Südost-Forschungen 65/66 (2006-2007): 87–116.
 "Skanderbeg reitet wieder: Wiederfindung und Erfindung eines (National-)Helden im balkanischen und gesamteuropäischen Kontext (15.–21. Jh.)", Schnittstellen. Gesellschaft, Nation, Konflikt und Erinnerung in Südosteuropa: Festschrift für Holm Sundhausen zum 65. Geburtstag, eds. Ulf Brunnbauer, Andreas Helmedach & Stefan Troebst, Munich: R. Oldenbourg Verlag, 2007. 401–419.
 "'Flucht aus dem Orient'? Kulturelle Orientierung und Identitäten im albanischsprachigen Balkan", Stabilität in Südosteuropa – eine Herausforderung für die Informationsvermittlung, ed. F. Görner, Berlin: 2008. 12–27.
 "Des melons pour la cour du Sancakbeg: Split et son arrière-pays ottoman à travers les registres de compte de l'administration vénitienne dans les années 1570", Living in the Ottoman Ecumenical Community: Essays in Honour of Suraiya Faroqhi, eds. V. Costantini & M. Koller, Leiden-Boston: Brill, 2008. 437–452.
 .
 .
 .
 Căpitan Codreanu: Aufstieg und Fall des rumänischen Faschistenführers. Vienna: Paul Zsolnay Verlag, 2016.
 .
 
 Edited volumes
 with Michael Metzeltin, Das Südosteuropa der Regionen. Vienna: Verlag der Österreichischen Akademie der Wissenschaften, 2015.
 The Ottoman Conquest of the Balkans: Interpretations and Research Debates. Vienna: Verlag der Österreichischen Akademie der Wissenschaften, 2016.

References

External links 
 Short biography of Oliver Schmitt, till 2011
 Interview with Oliver Jens Schmitt published in ResPublica on 11 February 2013

Historians of Europe
Living people
21st-century Swiss historians
Swiss male writers
Historiography of Skanderbeg
University of Vienna alumni
1973 births
Academic staff of the University of Vienna